Don Hannah (born in Shediac, New Brunswick) is a Canadian playwright and novelist. He won a Floyd S. Chalmers Canadian Play Award for his first play, The Wedding Script.

He has been playwright in residence at Tarragon Theatre, the Canadian Stage Company, the NotaBle Acts Theatre Festival, and was the inaugural Lee Playwright-in-Residence at the University of Alberta. His other residencies include the University of New Brunswick, the Yukon Public Library, and Green College, University of British Columbia. He is a founding member of PARC, the Playwrights Atlantic Resource Centre, and for five years was associate dramaturg at the Banff Centre Playwrights Colony. He had also worked as a dramaturg for Vancouver's Playwrights Theatre Centre. His novel Ragged Islands won the Thomas Head Raddall Award.

In 2012 his play The Cave Painter received the Carol Bolt award.

His latest play, Resident Aliens, will debut at Theatre New Brunswick in 2022.

Works

Plays

Full Length
 The Wedding Script (1986)
 Rubber Dolly (1986)
 In the Lobster Capital of the World (1988)
 Love Jive (1989) with composer David Sereda
 Siren Song (1990) with composer David Sereda
 The Wooden Hill (1994)
 Running Far Back (1994)
 Fathers and Sons (1998)
 While We're Young (2008)
 There is a Land of Pure Delight (2008)
 The Woodcutter (2010)
 The Cave Painter (2011)
 Resident Aliens (2022)

Shorts
 Firing Francine (1985)
 Undersea (1988)
 The Wall in the Garden (1989)
 Wedlock (1990)

Opera
 Facing South (2003) with composer Linda C. Smith

Novels
 The Wise and Foolish Virgins (1998)
 Ragged Islands (2007)

References

External links
Don Hannah's home page

20th-century Canadian dramatists and playwrights
21st-century Canadian dramatists and playwrights
20th-century Canadian novelists
21st-century Canadian novelists
Canadian male novelists
Canadian gay writers
Writers from New Brunswick
People from Shediac
Living people
Canadian LGBT dramatists and playwrights
Canadian LGBT novelists
Canadian male dramatists and playwrights
20th-century Canadian male writers
21st-century Canadian male writers
Year of birth missing (living people)
21st-century Canadian LGBT people
Gay dramatists and playwrights
Gay novelists